Pachygonidia mielkei is a moth of the family Sphingidae first described by Jean-Marie Cadiou in 1997. It is found in Brazil.

The length of the forewings is 32–35 mm for males and 35–37 mm for females. There is a distinct grey-brown submarginal patch on the forewing upperside and there are two median transverse pinkish-buff bands on the hindwing upperside.

References

Pachygonidia
Moths described in 1997